Philbrook is an unincorporated community in Todd County, Minnesota, United States. It is along Todd County Road 28 near Red Pine Road. Nearby places include Staples, Motley, Cushing, and Browerville.

History
Philbrook began as Riverside in 1859, and the post office was established in 1889, but because the name Riverside was already in use by another post office, the name was changed to Philbrook in 1890. The post office was changed to a rural branch in 1956 and discontinued in 1964. Philbrook had a station of the Northern Pacific Railroad in section 33 of Villard Township. Saint James Catholic Church in Philbrook was closed in 1962.

References

Unincorporated communities in Todd County, Minnesota
Unincorporated communities in Minnesota